Baduy may refer to:
 Baduy language, a Sundanese language dialect spoken in West Java, Indonesia
 Baduy people, a Sundanese community in West Java, Indonesia
 Baduy Indigenous Ban, a customary prohibition in the culture of the Baduy people in West Java, Indonesia
 Baduya, also known as Maruya, a traditional food from the Philippines

Language and nationality disambiguation pages